Periventricular means around the ventricle and may refer to:

Periventricular leukomalacia, a disease characterized by the death of the white matter near the cerebral ventricles
Periventricular nucleus, a composite structure of the hypothalamus